Wang Haochen (born 22 January 1999) is a Chinese footballer currently playing as a midfielder for Beijing BSU.

Career statistics

Club
.

References

1999 births
Living people
Chinese footballers
Chinese expatriate footballers
Association football midfielders
Tercera División players
China League Two players
China League One players
Atlético Madrid footballers
EC Granollers players
Beijing Sport University F.C. players
Chinese expatriate sportspeople in Spain
Expatriate footballers in Spain